Ovatipsa chinensis common name the Chinese cowrie, is a species of cowry, a sea snail, a marine gastropod mollusk in the family Cypraeidae, the cowries.

Description
The mantle of the animal is bright red, and it is completely covered by protruding short filaments. The shells of this species reach  of length. The shells are smooth and elongate, light brown or yellowish in color with clear dots on the dorsum and a flat white base. With the subspecies variolaria (Lamarck, 1810), the basic color of the shell is light brown, with slight purple spots on the edges.

Distribution and Habitat
The Chinese cowry is active at night and hides under rocks in cracks and crevices during the day.

Subspecies
The following subspecies have been recognized :
 Ovatipsa chinensis amiges (Melvill and Standen, 1915)
 Ovatipsa chinensis chinensis (Gmelin, 1791)
 Ovatipsa chinensis somaliana Lorenz, 1999
 Ovatipsa chinensis variolaria (Lamarck, 1810)
 Ovatipsa chinensis violacea (Rous, 1905)

References

 Copley, H. (1945). List of cowries collected on the Kenyan coast by Colonel Maxwell and friends during July, 1944. JEANHS XVII (83&84): 160
 Verdcourt, B. (1954). The cowries of the East African Coast (Kenya, Tanganyika, Zanzibar and Pemba). Journal of the East Africa Natural History Society 22(4) 96: 129-144, 17 pls.
 Drivas, J. & M. Jay (1988). Coquillages de La Réunion et de l'île Maurice

External links 
 Ovatipsa chinensis
 Good guys& Bad guys Hawaii Biological Survey's 
 On-line articles with Ovatipsa chinensis in the Hawaiian Shell News (1960-1994)
 
 Bishopmuseum

Cypraeidae
Gastropods described in 1791
Taxa named by Johann Friedrich Gmelin